Marianna Egorova (born 6 August 1997) is a Russian female handball player for Zvezda Zvenigorod in the Russian Super League.

She also represented Russia in the 2016 Women's Junior World Handball Championship, placing as runners-up.

On 14 March 2020, she extended her contract with Zvezda Zvenigorod, until the summer of 2021.

Achievements
Russian Super League
Bronze Medalist: 2015
Russian Cup:
Bronze Medalist: 2019
World Junior Championship:
Silver Medalist: 2016
European Junior Championship:
Silver Medalist: 2015

Individual awards 
 All-Star Left wing of the European Junior Championship: 2015

References

Weblinks 
 Profile of the Russian Handball Federation
 Profile on Zvezda Zvenigorod

1997 births
Living people
Russian female handball players
People from Maykop
Handball players at the 2014 Summer Youth Olympics
Sportspeople from Adygea